Santa Ana Chiautempan is a city in Chiautempan Municipality in the south-central part of the Mexican state of Tlaxcala.  The city serves as the municipal seat of the municipality, which covers an area of 66.21 km² (25.56 sq mi).  At the 2005 census it had a population of 46,776 inhabitants, the fourth-largest community in the state in population (after Villa Vicente Guerrero, Apizaco, and Huamantla). The city lies at the extreme western end of the municipality, which had a census population of 63,300 inhabitants.

Its largest other communities are the towns of San Bartolomé Cuahuixmatlac, San Pedro Tlalcuapan de Nicolás Bravo, and San Pedro Muñoztla.

Sister cities
  Nampo, North Korea

References

External links
Link to tables of population data from Census of 2005 INEGI: Instituto Nacional de Estadística, Geografía e Informática
Chiautempan (Enciclopedia de los Municipios de México)

Populated places in Tlaxcala